Russell Bradley (born 28 March 1966) is an English former footballer and highly rated left footed centre back who played in the Football League for Hereford United, Halifax Town, Scunthorpe United and Hartlepool United.

He played for Kidderminster Harriers  and Dudley Town before joining Nottingham Forest. After a serious injury he left Forest and signed for Hereford Utd having made a few appearances for Forest's first team in the League Cup and Simod Cup. His Professional career finished in 2002 aged 36, after playing for Hednesford Town  in the National League.

References

External links
 
 

1966 births
Living people
Footballers from Birmingham, West Midlands
English footballers
Association football defenders
Dudley Town F.C. players
Nottingham Forest F.C. players
Hereford United F.C. players
Halifax Town A.F.C. players
Scunthorpe United F.C. players
Hartlepool United F.C. players
Hednesford Town F.C. players
English Football League players
National League (English football) players